This list gives you a short details about publication Houses in India

India publishing houses 
 

HarperCollins India
Kathashilpa Publishing House
Notion Press
Prabhat Prakashan
Roli books
Sage Publications

References

Book publishing companies of India
Lists of book publishing companies